Snooker world ranking points 2006/2007: The official world ranking points for the 96 professional snooker players in the 2006–07 season are listed below. The total points from the seasons 2005–06 and 2006–07 were used to determine the rankings for the season 2007/2008.

Ranking points 
 
{| class="wikitable sortable" style="text-align: center;"
|-
! class=unsortable | No.
! width=165 | Player
! Points 2005/06
! NIT
! GP
! UK
! WO
! MC
! CO
! WSC
! Points 2006/07
! Total
|-
| 1 || style="text-align:left;"| John Higgins
| 19150 || 1900 || 2500 || 4800 || 700 || 700 || 2500 || 10000 || 23100 || 42250
|-
| 2 || style="text-align:left;"| Graeme Dott
| 19100 || 2500 || 575 || 4800 || 1900 || 2500 || 5000 || 1400 || 18675 || 37775
|-
| 3 || style="text-align:left;"| Shaun Murphy
| 16350 || 2500 || 1400 || 1050 || 2500 || 5000 || 2500 || 6400 || 21350 || 37700
|-
| 4 || style="text-align:left;"| Ken Doherty
| 20250 || 2500 || 1900 || 2850 || 1900 || 2500 || 2500 || 1400 || 15550 || 35800
|-
| 5 || style="text-align:left;"| Ronnie O'Sullivan
| 12850 || 4000 || 2500 || 2850 || 2500 || 700 || 3200 || 5000 || 20750 || 33600
|-
| 6 || style="text-align:left;"| Peter Ebdon
| 15550 || 700 || 1400 || 7500 || 700 || 3200 || 700 || 3800 || 18000 || 33550
|-
| 7 || style="text-align:left;"| Neil Robertson
| 12575 || 1900 || 5000 || 1050 || 5000 || 1900 || 1900 || 3800 || 20550 || 33125
|-
| 8 || style="text-align:left;"| Stephen Hendry
| 15100 || 1900 || 575 || 6000 || 1900 || 2500 || 700 || 3800 || 17375 || 32475
|-
| 9 || style="text-align:left;"| Ding Junhui
| 14475 || 5000 || 1400 || 3750 || 575 || 1400 || 1400 || 2800 || 16325 || 30800
|-
| 10 || style="text-align:left;"| Stephen Maguire
| 11000 || 1900 || 1400 || 2850 || 3200 || 1900 || 1900 || 6400 || 19550 || 30550
|-
| 11 || style="text-align:left;"| Mark Selby
| 9125 || 1900 || 1900 || 2100 || 1900 || 575 || 1900 || 8000 || 18275 || 27400
|-
| 12 || style="text-align:left;"| Mark Williams
| 18300 || 1900 || 575 || 2850 || 700 || 700 || 700 || 1400 || 8825 || 27125
|-
| 13 || style="text-align:left;"| Stephen Lee
| 13500 || 3200 || 1900 || 2850 || 700 || 1900 || 700 || 1400 || 12650 || 26150
|-
| 14 || style="text-align:left;"| Ali Carter
| 9550 || 700 || 1400 || 1050 || 2500 || 3200 || 1900 || 5000 || 15750 || 25300
|-
| 15 || style="text-align:left;"| Steve Davis
| 13100 || 700 || 1400 || 3750 || 3200 || 700 || 700 || 1400 || 11850 || 24950
|-
| 16 || style="text-align:left;"| Ryan Day
| 10050 || 2500 || 1900 || 2100 || 575 || 4000 || 575 || 2800 || 14450 || 24500
|-
| 17 || style="text-align:left;"| Joe Swail
| 12600 || 575 || 1400 || 2100 || 1400 || 575 || 1900 || 3800 || 11750 || 24350
|-
| 18 || style="text-align:left;"| Joe Perry
| 11750 || 575 || 2500 || 3750 || 1400 || 575 || 575 || 2800 || 12175 || 23925
|-
| 19 || style="text-align:left;"| Barry Hawkins
| 14600 || 700 || 1400 || 1050 || 700 || 700 || 3200 || 1400 || 9150 || 23750
|-
| 20 || style="text-align:left;"| Matthew Stevens
| 8600 || 1900 || 1900 || 2850 || 700 || 700 || 1900 || 5000 || 14950 || 23550
|-
| 21 || style="text-align:left;"| Mark King
| 10100 || 1400 || 3200 || 2100 || 575 || 2500 || 1400 || 1150 || 12325 || 22425
|-
| 22 || style="text-align:left;"| Jamie Cope
| 10375 || 450 || 4000 || 675 || 1400 || 450 || 4000 || 900 || 11875 || 22250
|-
| 23 || style="text-align:left;"| Stuart Bingham
| 12300 || 575 || 575 || 2850 || 1400 || 1400 || 1900 || 1150 || 9850 || 22150
|-
| 24 || style="text-align:left;"| Michael Holt
| 11275 || 575 || 1400 || 863 || 1400 || 1900 || 1400 || 2800 || 10338 || 21613
|-
| 25 || style="text-align:left;"| Nigel Bond
| 10350 || 1400 || 1400 || 863 || 1900 || 1400 || 575 || 2800 || 10338 || 20688
|-
| 26 || style="text-align:left;"| Anthony Hamilton
| 9413 || 700 || 575 || 863 || 2500 || 700 || 700 || 5000 || 11038 || 20451
|-
| 27 || style="text-align:left;"| Marco Fu
| 11500 || 575 || 575 || 0 || 575 || 1900 || 2500 || 2800 || 8925 || 20425
|-
| 28 || style="text-align:left;"| Ian McCulloch
| 7188 || 1400 || 2500 || 863 || 1400 || 575 || 1400 || 3800 || 11938 || 19126
|-
| 29 || style="text-align:left;"| Mark Allen
| 8250 || 1150 || 1150 || 1350 || 1150 || 900 || 1150 || 3800 || 10650 || 18900
|-
| 30 || style="text-align:left;"| Dave Harold
| 9625 || 450 || 900 || 2100 || 1900 || 1150 || 450 || 2300 || 9250 || 18875
|-
| 31 || style="text-align:left;"| Dominic Dale
| 8700 || 3200 || 1150 || 675 || 450 || 1150 || 450 || 2300 || 9375 || 18075
|-
| 32 || style="text-align:left;"| Gerard Greene
| 8600 || 1900 || 1400 || 2100 || 1400 || 450 || 1150 || 900 || 9300 || 17900
|-
| 33 || style="text-align:left;"| James Wattana
| 11150 || 1400 || 575 || 863 || 575 || 575 || 1400 || 1150 || 6538 || 17688
|-
| 34 || style="text-align:left;"| Michael Judge
| 7475 || 1150 || 1150 || 1725 || 1900 || 1400 || 450 || 2300 || 10075 || 17550
|-
| 35 || style="text-align:left;"| David Gray
| 9713 || 575 || 1900 || 2100 || 575 || 575 || 575 || 1150 || 7450 || 17163
|-
| 36 || style="text-align:left;"| Ricky Walden
| 8225 || 450 || 900 || 2100 || 1150 || 1400 || 450 || 2300 || 8750 || 16975
|-
| 37 || style="text-align:left;"| Fergal O'Brien
| 7125 || 450 || 1400 || 675 || 450 || 1900 || 1150 || 3800 || 9825 || 16950
|-
| 38 || style="text-align:left;"| Alan McManus
| 6200 || 575 || 3200 || 2850 || 1400 || 575 || 575 || 1150 || 10325 || 16525
|-
| 39 || style="text-align:left;"| John Parrott
| 6663 || 450 || 900 || 1725 || 1150 || 1150 || 450 || 3800 || 9625 || 16288
|-
| 40 || style="text-align:left;"| Adrian Gunnell
| 6675 || 450 || 900 || 1725 || 1150 || 1150 || 1150 || 2300 || 8825 || 15500
|-
| 41 || style="text-align:left;"| Andy Hicks
| 7613 || 575 || 575 || 863 || 575 || 575 || 1400 || 2800 || 7363 || 14976
|-
| 42 || style="text-align:left;"| Andrew Norman
| 6600 || 1400 || 1900 || 488 || 900 || 900 || 900 || 1800 || 8288 || 14888
|-
| 43 || style="text-align:left;"| Mark Davis
| 8400 || 450 || 900 || 675 || 450 || 450 || 1150 || 2300 || 6375 || 14775
|-
| 44 || style="text-align:left;"| Andrew Higginson
| 4100 || 650 || 650 || 975 || 4000 || 1900 || 650 || 1800 || 10625 || 14725
|-
| 45 || style="text-align:left;"| David Gilbert
| 5975 || 900 || 650 || 1350 || 1400 || 1150 || 325 || 2800 || 8575 || 14550
|-
| 46 || style="text-align:left;"| Jamie Burnett
| 5125 || 1400 || 200 || 2100 || 1900 || 325 || 1150 || 2300 || 9375 || 14500
|-
| 47 || style="text-align:left;"| Robert Milkins
| 6338 || 1400 || 1900 || 863 || 575 || 1400 || 575 || 1150 || 7863 || 14201
|-
| 48 || style="text-align:left;"| Rory McLeod
| 5825 || 1150 || 900 || 1725 || 900 || 900 || 325 || 2300 || 8200 || 14025
|-
| 49 || style="text-align:left;"| Rod Lawler
| 5850 || 1150 || 650 || 2100 || 1150 || 1400 || 450 || 900 || 7800 || 13650
|-
| 50 || style="text-align:left;"| Tom Ford
| 6300 || 450 || 1400 || 675 || 450 || 1900 || 1400 || 900 || 7175 || 13475
|-
| 51 || style="text-align:left;"| Judd Trump
| 4800 || 900 || 1150 || 1350 || 650 || 650 || 1150 || 2800 || 8650 || 13450
|-
| 52 || style="text-align:left;"| Marcus Campbell
| 5200 || 450 || 650 || 1725 || 450 || 1400 || 1150 || 2300 || 8125 || 13325
|-
| 53 || style="text-align:left;"| Stuart Pettman
| 7975 || 1400 || 650 || 488 || 900 || 325 || 900 || 650 || 5313 || 13288
|-
| 54 || style="text-align:left;"| Robin Hull
| 6338 || 325 || 1400 || 2850 || 325 || 325 || 900 || 650 || 6775 || 13113
|-
| 55 || style="text-align:left;"| David Roe
| 7375 || 1400 || 1150 || 488 || 325 || 1400 || 325 || 650 || 5738 || 13113
|-
| 56 || style="text-align:left;"| Barry Pinches
| 7563 || 450 || 650 || 1725 || 450 || 450 || 450 || 900 || 5075 || 12638
|-
| 57 || style="text-align:left;"| Drew Henry
| 6825 || 450 || 200 || 675 || 450 || 450 || 1150 || 2300 || 5675 || 12500
|-
| 58 || style="text-align:left;"| Joe Delaney
| 4975 || 900 || 200 || 1725 || 1150 || 325 || 325 || 2800 || 7425 || 12400
|-
| 59 || style="text-align:left;"| Mike Dunn
| 5238 || 1400 || 200 || 2100 || 900 || 325 || 325 || 1800 || 7050 || 12288
|-
| 60 || style="text-align:left;"| Jimmy White
| 6450 || 450 || 900 || 675 || 450 || 450 || 1900 || 900 || 5725 || 12175
|-
| 61 || style="text-align:left;"| Jimmy Michie
| 4413 || 1150 || 900 || 1350 || 900 || 1150 || 325 || 1800 || 7575 || 11988
|-
| 62 || style="text-align:left;"| Paul Davies
| 5500 || 1150 || 650 || 488 || 325 || 900 || 900 || 1800 || 6213 || 11713
|-
| 63 || style="text-align:left;"| Scott MacKenzie
| 6050 || 325 || 650 || 2100 || 325 || 325 || 900 || 650 || 5275 || 11325
|-
| 64 || style="text-align:left;"| Ian Preece
| 4100 || 200 || 900 || 1350 || 1150 || 650 || 1400 || 1300 || 6950 || 11050
|-
| 65 || style="text-align:left;"| Lee Spick
| 5450 || 650 || 900 || 300 || 650 || 650 || 1150 || 1300 || 5600 || 11050
|-
| 66 || style="text-align:left;"| Liang Wenbo
| 4125 || 650 || 1400 || 975 || 1150 || 650 || 650 || 1300 || 6775 || 10900
|-
| 67 || style="text-align:left;"| Joe Jogia
| 5050 || 325 || 200 || 488 || 325 || 1150 || 1400 || 1800 || 5688 || 10738
|-
| 68 || style="text-align:left;"| Tony Drago
| 4525 || 1150 || 650 || 1350 || 900 || 900 || 325 || 650 || 5925 || 10450
|-
| 69 || style="text-align:left;"| Tian Pengfei
| 4100 || 1400 || 200 || 975 || 200 || 1150 || 900 || 1300 || 6125 || 10225
|-
| 70 || style="text-align:left;"| Matthew Couch
| 5525 || 1150 || 650 || 300 || 200 || 200 || 650 || 1300 || 4450 || 9975
|-
| 71 || style="text-align:left;"| David Morris
| 4100 || 200 || 900 || 1350 || 900 || 650 || 200 || 1300 || 5500 || 9600
|-
| 72 || style="text-align:left;"| Liu Song
| 4100 || 650 || 200 || 1725 || 650 || 200 || 200 || 1800 || 5425 || 9525
|-
| 73 || style="text-align:left;"| Mark Joyce
| 4100 || 650 || 200 || 300 || 650 || 900 || 900 || 1800 || 5400 || 9500
|-
| 74 || style="text-align:left;"| Alfie Burden
| 4100 || 650 || 650 || 300 || 200 || 900 || 1400 || 1300 || 5400 || 9500
|-
| 75 || style="text-align:left;"| Ben Woollaston
| 4100 || 650 || 1150 || 975 || 1400 || 200 || 200 || 400 || 4975 || 9075
|-
| 76 || style="text-align:left;"| James Leadbetter
| 4100 || 200 || 650 || 975 || 650 || 200 || 200 || 1800 || 4675 || 8775
|-
| 77 || style="text-align:left;"| Peter Lines
| 4100 || 200 || 900 || 1350 || 200 || 650 || 900 || 400 || 4600 || 8700
|-
| 78 || style="text-align:left;"| Chris Norbury
| 4663 || 650 || 900 || 300 || 200 || 900 || 650 || 400 || 4000 || 8663
|-
| 79 || style="text-align:left;"| Issara Kachaiwong
| 4100 || 200 || 1400 || 975 || 650 || 200 || 650 || 400 || 4475 || 8575
|-
| 80 || style="text-align:left;"| Sean Storey
| 3700 || 650 || 900 || 1350 || 650 || 650 || 200 || 400 || 4800 || 8500
|-
| 81 || style="text-align:left;"| Passakorn Suwannawat
| 4100 || 200 || 200 || 975 || 200 || 200 || 650 || 1800 || 4225 || 8325
|-
| 82 || style="text-align:left;"| Jamie Jones
| 4100 || 650 || 1150 || 975 || 650 || 200 || 200 || 400 || 4225 || 8325
|-
| 83 || style="text-align:left;"| Paul Davison
| 4100 || 200 || 1150 || 300 || 200 || 650 || 200 || 1300 || 4000 || 8100
|-
| 84 || style="text-align:left;"| Alex Borg
| 4000 || 200 || 200 || 300 || 900 || 200 || 650 || 1300 || 3750 || 7750
|-
| 85 || style="text-align:left;"| Chris Melling
| 4100 || 650 || 900 || 300 || 200 || 900 || 200 || 400 || 3550 || 7650
|-
| 86 || style="text-align:left;"| Shokat Ali
| 4088 || 325 || 900 || 488 || 325 || 325 || 325 || 650 || 3338 || 7426
|-
| 87 || style="text-align:left;"| Dermot McGlinchey
| 4100 || 900 || 650 || 300 || 650 || 200 || 200 || 400 || 3300 || 7400
|-
| 88 || style="text-align:left;"| Lee Page
| 4100 || 650 || 200 || 300 || 200 || 200 || 200 || 1300 || 3050 || 7150
|-
| 89 || style="text-align:left;"| Dene O'Kane
| 4100 || 0 || 0 || 975 || 200 || 200 || 900 || 400 || 2675 || 6775
|-
| 90 || style="text-align:left;"| Mohammed Shehab
| 4100 || 200 || 650 || 300 || 200 || 650 || 200 || 400 || 2600 || 6700
|-
| 91 || style="text-align:left;"| Robert Stephen
| 4100 || 200 || 650 || 300 || 650 || 200 || 200 || 400 || 2600 || 6700
|-
| 92 || style="text-align:left;"| Jeff Cundy
| 4100 || 200 || 200 || 975 || 200 || 200 || 200 || 400 || 2375 || 6475
|-
| 93 || style="text-align:left;"| Mark Boyle
| 4100 || 200 || 200 || 300 || 200 || 200 || 650 || 400 || 2150 || 6250
|-
| 94 || style="text-align:left;"| Patrick Einsle
| 4100 || 200 || 650 || 300 || 200 || 200 || 200 || 400 || 2150 || 6250
|-
| 95 || style="text-align:left;"| Paul Wykes
| 4250 || 0 || 200 || 300 || 200 || 900 || 0 || 400 || 2000 || 6250
|-
| 96 || style="text-align:left;"| Roy Stolk
| 4100 || 200 || 200 || 300 || 200 || 200 || 200 || 400 || 1700 || 5800
|}

Notes

References

2006
Ranking points 2007
Ranking points 2006